The McCarthy Power Plant, also known as the Mother Lode Coalition Mining Company Power House and the Mother Lode Plant, is a historic power plant building in the small community of McCarthy, Alaska, in the heart of Wrangell-St. Elias National Park and Preserve.  It is a three-story wood-frame structure with a clerestory roof, located on the banks of McCarthy Creek.  It was built in 1917, after the arrival of the Copper River and Northwestern Railway in the area kicked of a building boom.  The coal-fired power plant was built to provide electricity for the operation of a tramway and other facilities of the Kennecott mines.  Most of the transmission lines and the tramway were destroyed by avalanches in 1919, and other changes made soon afterward made the power plant unnecessary, and its turbine was moved up to Kennecott.

The building was listed on the National Register of Historic Places in 1979.

See also
National Register of Historic Places listings in Wrangell-St. Elias National Park and Preserve
National Register of Historic Places listings in Copper River Census Area, Alaska

References

1917 establishments in Alaska
Buildings and structures completed in 1917
Buildings and structures on the National Register of Historic Places in Copper River Census Area, Alaska
Energy infrastructure on the National Register of Historic Places
Industrial buildings and structures on the National Register of Historic Places in Alaska
National Register of Historic Places in Wrangell–St. Elias National Park and Preserve
Power stations in Alaska